The U.S. Department of the Interior Office of Inspector General (DOI OIG) is one of the Inspector General offices created by the Inspector General Act of 1978. The Inspector General for the Department of the Interior is charged with investigating and auditing department programs to combat waste, fraud, and abuse.

History of Inspectors General

References 

Interior Office of Inspector General, Department of
United States Department of the Interior
United States Department of the Interior agencies